Rhode is a genus of  woodlouse hunting spiders that was first described by Eugène Simon in 1882.

Species
 it contains nine species:
Rhode aspinifera (Nikolic, 1963) – Slovenia
Rhode baborensis Beladjal & Bosmans, 1996 – Algeria
Rhode biscutata Simon, 1893 – Mediterranean
Rhode magnifica Deeleman-Reinhold, 1978 – Montenegro
Rhode scutiventris Simon, 1882 (type) – Portugal, Spain, Morocco, Algeria
Rhode stalitoides Deeleman-Reinhold, 1978 – Bosnia-Hercegovina
Rhode subterranea (Kratochvíl, 1935) – Bosnia-Hercegovina
Rhode tenuipes (Simon, 1882) – France (Corsica)
Rhode testudinea Pesarini, 1984 – Italy

References

Araneomorphae genera
Dysderidae
Taxa named by Eugène Simon